Storsylen is a mountain in the municipality of Tydal in Trøndelag county, Norway. At , Storsylen is the highest mountain in the Sylan mountain range. To climb the mountain from the south, the route is characterized as scrambling, from the north it is an easy hike.

Name
The first element is stor meaning "big" and the last element is the finite singular form of syl which means "awl".

Media gallery

References

External links

Tydal
Mountains of Trøndelag